All Beijing Subway trains run on  rail and draw power from the , except those on Lines 6, 11 14, 16, 17 and 19, which use  overhead wires. Currently, Lines 1, 2, 4, 5, 8, 9, 10, 13, 15, Batong, Daxing, Changping, Fangshan, Yanfang, and Yizhuang lines use 6 car B size trains. Initially, the Batong line and Line 13 was originally used 4 car trains and now expanded into six.

Type B Trains 
Most lines operate the six-car Type-B train set that can carry 1,460 passengers per train and transport 43,800 passengers per hour. Lines 6 and 7 use eight-car Type-B train sets that can carry 1,960 passengers per train and 58,800 passengers per hour. The Type-B trains sets of Lines 6 and 7 can draw  power and can reach . The Yanfang Line operates four-car Type-B train sets with ”driverless” automatic train operation.

Type A Trains 
Type-A cars run on Lines 11, 14, 16, 17, 19 and under construction Lines 3 and 12. They are 3.1 meters longer, and 20 cm wider than Type-B cars with a designed capacity of 310 passengers per car and 10 sets of doors per train compared to 8 sets of doors per train on Type-B cars. Type A cars draw  power from overhead wire and can reach . Line 14 uses six-car Type A train sets which can carry 1,860 passengers per train and allow for throughput of up to 55,800 passengers per hour per direction. Lines 16, 17 and 19 uses eight-car Type-A train sets which can carry 2,480 passengers per train and allow for throughput of up 74,400 passengers per hour per direction.

Type L trains 
The under construction Line 28 will also use L type trains but 6 cars long.

Type D Trains 
These trains are powered by  overhead wires. The eight-car train sets have seven passenger cars and one car to carry luggage. The under construction Line 22 will also use eight-car Type-D trains.

Maglev 
The S1 Line's maglev trains feature six-car train sets that run on  power and can reach . Compared to subway trains that run on conventional track, the maglev train has a smaller minimum turning radius of 75 meters compared to 200 meters, can climb steeper slope of 53‰ versus 40‰ and emits less noise. The six-car train set can carry 1,032 passengers.

Light Rail Transit 
The Xijiao LRT and Yizhuang Tram Line T1 operates five-car trams that draw  from overhead lines and can reach .

Manufacturers 
From the subway's inception to 2003, all Beijing subway trains were manufactured by CNR Changchun Railway Vehicles Co. Ltd. All rolling stock on Lines 2, 5, 6, 9, 10, 13, 15, Yizhuang line, Capital Airport Express and some of Line 1, 14, 16, and Yanfang line stocks are produced by CNR Changchun. However, CSR Qingdao Sifang Co., Ltd. has recently produced rolling stock for the Beijing subway. CSR Sifang produced all the trains for Lines 4, 8, Daxing, Changping, Daxing Airport Express and some of Line 1, 14, 16, and Yanfang line.

The Beijing Subway Rolling Stock Equipment Co. Ltd., a wholly owned subsidiary of the Beijing Mass Transit Railway Operation Corp., provides local assemblage, maintenance and repair services. It has also made trains for line 7, Batong, and Fangshan lines.

History

First Generation 
In the 1960s to mid-1970s, the Beijing Subway used DK2 and DK3 models made in Changchun.  The DK stands for diandong keche or electrically-operated passenger car.  These models and their derivatives, the DK3G, DK20, DK16A, BD1 and BD2 are classified by the Beijing Subway as the first generation. In recent decades, the Beijing Subway Rolling Stock Equipment Co. refurbished the DK16A and DK20 models, which remained in use well into the first decade of the 21st century.  The refurbished DK16AG trains entered into service on Line 2 in 2005.

Pyongyang Metro DK4 cars 
During the opening of Line 13 some ex-Pyongyang Metro Changchun DK4 cars were used until the new order of cars replaced them.

Second Generation 
From the 1980 to the early 1990s, the subway introduced several new models including the DK6, DK9 and their derivatives the DK11, DK16 and GTO. The M-series trains that appeared on Lines 2 and 13 were made by Japan's Tokyu Car Corporation.

Third Generation 
In 1998, the subway began deploying a new generation of train sets that featured variable voltage variable frequency (VVVF) control mechanisms. These models include the DKZ4, DKZ5, and the DKZ6.  DKZ stands for diandong keche zu or electric passenger train sets. CNR Changchun also made 174 DK28-DK31 metro cars, which uses VVVF inverters and AC motors for Line 1, and 136 DK32-34 trains for Line 13. In 2005, the Batong line began using SFX01 and SFX02 trains made by CSR Qingdao Sifang.
The 40 trains of the Airport Express were made by a joint-venture between CRRC Changchun and Bombardier Transportation, and uses Bombardier's Innovia Advanced Rapid Transit (ART) 200 technology.

Fourth Generation 
Since 2017, trains have been ordered with capabilities for unattended automatic train operation. Starting with the DKZ70 and SFM16 trains on the Yanfang Line. Since then trains on the Daxing Airport Express, Lines 11, 17 and 19 operate or are capable of operating in GoA4 unattended train operation mode.

Current Fleet

References

External links 

 Official Beijing Subway Website
 World Subways by Robert McConnell

Beijing Subway
Lists of rolling stock